Elections to Rochford Council were held on 1 May 2003. One third of the council was up for election and the Conservative party stayed in overall control of the council.

After the election, the composition of the council was:

Election result

Ward results

Ashingdon and Canewdon

Barling and Sutton

Downhall and Rawreth

Foulness and Great Wakering

Grange

Hawkwell North

Hawkwell South

Hawkwell West

Hockley Central

Hullbridge

Lodge

Rochford

Sweyne Park

References
2003 Rochford election result
Ward results

2003
2003 English local elections
2000s in Essex